India (born May 17, 1977) is a former pornographic actress, singer and rapper.

She began working as an adult actress in around 1998 and has since appeared in over 200 videos. For five years she was an exclusive contract girl for the production company Video Team, and she has an exclusive sex toy line, manufactured by California Exotic Novelties.

India owns the record company Black Widow Entertainment, and in 2006 she released her debut solo album Role Play. She had previously been a member of several girl groups; her first album, Hi Naturally, was released in 1994 when she was in the group Harmony Innocents. In July 2002 she was profiled on VH1's All Access hip-hop/porn special. In 2004 her vocals featured in the movie Walking Tall, starring Dwayne Johnson.

Awards and nominations
2000 AVN Award nominee – Best New Starlet
2004 AVN Award nominee – Most Outrageous Sex Scene – Hustlaz: Diary of a Pimp
2004 AVN Award nominee – Best Tease Performance – Hustlaz: Diary of a Pimp
2008 AVN Award nominee – Best Supporting Actress, Video – Afrodite Superstar
2011 Urban X Awards Hall of Fame

References

External links
 
 
 

American pornographic film actresses
1977 births
Living people
African-American pornographic film actors
American women singers
American women rappers
African-American women rappers
21st-century American rappers
21st-century American women musicians
21st-century African-American women
21st-century African-American musicians
20th-century African-American people
20th-century African-American women
21st-century women rappers